Raúl Fragoso Ferreira Duarte, (born 1963) is an Angolan basketball coach. He has won the Angolan national championship with Recreativo do Libolo at the 2012-13 season. Prior to that, he has been a 5-time champion with Interclube's women's and a 5-time national champion with G.D. Nocal women's basketball teams.

At present, Raúl Duarte is the chairman of the Angolan basketball coach association and the head coach of Universidade Lusíada's men's basketball.

References 

1963 births
Living people
Angolan basketball coaches
Atlético Petróleos de Luanda (basketball) coaches